Bianca Barbosa Basílio (born 2 February 1996) also known as Bia Basílio is a submission grappler, mixed martial artist and Brazilian Jiu Jitsu (BJJ) competitor. A multiple time world champion in coloured belts, Basílio is the 2022 black belt World Jiu-Jitsu Champion, a 2019 Pan American Champion, ADCC Submission Fighting World Champion and a three times Abu Dhabi World Pro Champion.

Early life 
Bianca Barbosa Basílio was born on 2 February 1996 in Franca, Brazil, when she was a young age her family moved and settled in Itaquera.

Career

Brazilian Jiu-Jitsu 
After practicing gymnastic for a few years she discovered Jiu-Jitsu. From the age of 12 she started training with Diogo Almeida, the co-founder of Almeida JJ, at a social project in the back of his house. After receiving her orange belt brother Caio Almeida took over her training. At 15 she won her first world title in the blue belt junior division. In 2016, as a brown belt, Basílio won the Brazil Nationals, the Pan-American Championship and the World Jiu-Jitsu Championship, resulting in her promotion to black belt in December of the same year by her teachers, Caio and Diego Almeida. In June 2022 Basílio became the 2022 World Jiu-Jitsu Champion after defeating Amanda Canuto via advantages (0-0, 3-0 advantages).

Basilio was booked to compete against Tammi Musumeci in a strawweight submission grappling match at ONE Fight Night 8 on March 24, 2023.

Mixed Martial Arts (MMA) 
In 2022, Basílio joined amateur mixed martial arts and joined Team Bahrain at the IMMAF Super Cup representing the Kingdom of Bahrain. She made her MMA debut in the quarterfinals after defeating Tajikistan's Shohona Ghozoeva in the opening round via armbar. Team Bahrain ended up MMA Super Cup champions after defeating team Ireland in the final.

Championships and accomplishments

IMMAF 
 Team Bahrain – Super Cup Gold Medalist 2022

Mixed martial arts record 

|-
| Win
| align=center| 1–0
| Shohona Ghozoeva
| Submission (armbar)
| 2022 MMA Super Cup
| 
| align=center| 1
| align=center| 1:03
| Manama, Bahrain
|
|-

Brazilian Jiu-Jitsu competitive summary 
Main Achievements at black belt level:
 IBJJF World Champion (2022)
 2nd Place IBJJF World Championship (2019 / 2021)
 IBJJF Pan-American Champion (2017 / 2021)
 2nd place IBJJF Pan Champion (2018)
 3rd place IBJJF Pan Championship (2018, 2019, 2021)
 Abu Dhabi World Pro Champion (2018 / 2019 / 2021)
 2 x Abu Dhabi Grand Slam Champion (Abu Dhabi 2019) (Rio 2018)

Main Achievements (Coloured Belts):

 IBJJF World Champion (2014 /2015 purple, 2016 brown)
 IBJJF European Champion (2015 purple)
 IBJJF Pan Champion (2015 purple, 2016 brown)
 IBJJF Juvenile Pan Champion (2013 blue)
 IBJJF Juvenile World Champion (2012–2013 blue)
 IBJJF Juvenile Brazilian Nationals Champion (2013 blue)
 2nd place AJP Abu Dhabi Pro (2015–2016 brown/black)
 2nd place IBJJF Pan Championship (2015 purple)
 2nd place IBJJF Brazilian Nationals (2015 purple)
 3rd place IBJJF World Championship (2014 purple)
 3rd place IBJJF Pan Championship (2014 purple)
 3rd place IBJJF Brazilian Nationals (2016 brown)

Grappling competitive summary 
 ADCC World Champion (2019)

Notes

References

External links 
 

Living people
1996 births
People from Franca
Sportspeople from São Paulo
Brazilian practitioners of Brazilian jiu-jitsu
People awarded a black belt in Brazilian jiu-jitsu
World Brazilian Jiu-Jitsu Championship medalists
Female Brazilian jiu-jitsu practitioners
Brazilian submission wrestlers
Brazilian female mixed martial artists
Flyweight mixed martial artists
Mixed martial artists utilizing Brazilian jiu-jitsu
Brazilian jiu-jitsu world champions (women)
Brazilian jiu-jitsu practitioners who have competed in MMA (women)
ADCC Submission Fighting World Champions (women)